Dieter Nüssing (born 15 August 1949) is a German former professional footballer who played as a midfielder. He spent the majority of his career in the 2. Bundesliga at 1. FC Nürnberg, and is part of the staff at the club as a coach.

References

External links 
 
 Dieter Nüssing at glubberer.de 

1949 births
Living people
Association football midfielders
German footballers
Bundesliga players
2. Bundesliga players
1. FC Nürnberg players
Hertha BSC players
FC La Chaux-de-Fonds players
German expatriate footballers
German expatriate sportspeople in Switzerland
Expatriate footballers in Switzerland
Sportspeople from Rhineland-Palatinate